Events from the year 1744 in Ireland.

Incumbent
Monarch: George II

Events
26 February – a house in Pill Lane, Dublin, collapses while Roman Catholic mass is being held there, killing the priest and nine of the congregation.
14 April – the Physico-Historical Society is formed in Dublin for the preservation of 'manuscripts, rare printed books, and natural curiosities relating to Ireland'.
20 April – Arthur Price is translated from Meath to become Church of Ireland Archbishop of Cashel (letters patent 7 May).
23 May – the Hospital for Incurables is opened in Dublin as a charitable institution.
1 August (12 August New Style) – Battle of Velletri in the Kingdom of Naples: Spanish-Neapolitan forces defeat those of the Archduchy of Austria. Irish mercenaries fight on both sides.
3 August – the Colthurst Baronetcy, of Ardrum in the County of Cork, is created in the Baronetage of Ireland.
c. October – wet and cold season, leading to oats and potatoes being spoiled in the north – the 'rot year'.

Arts and literature
5 February – Spranger Barry makes his stage debut at the Theatre Royal, Dublin (Smock Alley).
6 December – first performance of Handel's Irish-premiered oratorio Messiah in Cork, at St. Finbarr's Cathedral.
Drawing school of the Dublin Society is founded.

Births
11 July – Pierce Butler, soldier, planter, statesman, one of United States' Founding Fathers, represented South Carolina in the Continental Congress and the U.S. Senate (died 1822).
Full date unknown
Robert Brooke, soldier, Governor of St Helena (died 1811).
Bishop James Murphy, Bishop of Clogher 1801–1824 (died 1824).
Robert Owenson, actor and author (died 1812).

Deaths
11 January – James Hamilton, 7th Earl of Abercorn (born 1686).
23 January – Thomas Griffith, actor (born 1680).

References

 
Years of the 18th century in Ireland
Ireland
1740s in Ireland